Mark Woolf (born September 30, 1970) is a retired professional ice hockey and roller hockey player who was drafted by Boston Bruins 126th overall in the 1990 NHL Entry Draft. He also competed at the IIHF InLine Hockey World Championship representing Canada.

Career statistics

Ice hockey

Roller hockey

References

Spielerportrait: Mark Woolf
Oakland Skates

External links
 

1970 births
Adirondack Red Wings players
Ayr Scottish Eagles players
Boston Bruins draft picks
Canadian expatriate ice hockey players in England
Canadian expatriate ice hockey players in Scotland
Canadian expatriate ice hockey players in the United States
Canadian ice hockey right wingers
Columbus Chill players
Huntington Blizzard players
Living people
Medicine Hat Tigers players
Milton Keynes Lightning players
Roanoke Valley Rebels players
Salt Lake Golden Eagles (IHL) players
San Diego Gulls (WCHL) players
San Jose Rhinos players
Spokane Chiefs players
Springfield Indians players
Thunder Bay Thunder Hawks players
Worcester IceCats players
Canadian expatriate ice hockey players in Austria
Canadian expatriate ice hockey players in Germany